This list of genocides includes estimates of all deaths which were directly or indirectly caused by genocide, as it is defined by the UN Convention on Genocide. It excludes  mass killings which may be referred to as genocide by some scholars and are variously also called mass murder, crimes against humanity, politicide, classicide, or war crimes, such as the Thirty Years' War (7.5 million deaths), Japanese war crimes (3 to 14 million deaths), the Red Terror (100,000 to 1.3 million deaths), the Atrocities in the Congo Free State (1 to 15 million deaths), the Great Purge (0.6 to 1.75 million deaths), the Great Leap Forward and the famine which followed it (15 to 55 million deaths). A broader list of genocides, ethnic cleansing and related mass persecution is available. Genocides in history include cases where there is less consensus among scholars as to whether they constituted genocide.

Definition 
The United Nations Genocide Convention defines genocide as "any of the following acts committed with intent to destroy, in whole or in part, a national, ethnical, racial or religious group, as such: killing members of the group; causing serious bodily or mental harm to members of the group; deliberately inflicting on the group conditions of life calculated to bring about its physical destruction in whole or in part; imposing measures intended to prevent births within the group; [and] forcibly transferring children of the group to another group".

List of genocides
Listed in descending order of lowest estimate.

See also 

 Casualty recording 
 Genocidal massacre
 Genocide of indigenous peoples
 Genocides in history
 Hamoodur Rahman Commission
 List of ongoing armed conflicts
 List of wars and anthropogenic disasters by death toll
 List of wars by death toll

Political extermination campaigns 
 Anti-communist mass killings
 Dirty War
 Indonesian mass killings of 1965–66
 Mass killings of landlords under Mao Zedong (1949–1951)
 Mass killings under communist regimes
 Operation Condor
 Red Terror (Ethiopia)
 White Terror (Spain)

Notes

References

Bibliography 

 
 
 
 
 
 
 
 
 
 
 
 
 
 

Genocides by death toll
Genocides
Genocides by death toll